Septicollarina is a genus of brachiopods belonging to the family Aulacothyropsidae.

The species of this genus are found in Malesia.

Species:

Septicollarina hemiechinata 
Septicollarina oceanica 
Septicollarina zezinae

References

Brachiopod genera